The 2019 UCLA Bruins softball team represented the University of California, Los Angeles in the 2019 college softball season.  The Bruins were coached by Kelly Inouye-Perez, in her thirteenth season.  The Bruins played their home games at Easton Stadium and finished with a record of 56–6.  They competed in the Pac-12 Conference, where they finished tied for first with a 20–4 record.

The Bruins were invited to the 2019 NCAA Division I softball tournament, where they swept the Los Angeles Regional and Super Regional and then completed a run through the Women's College World Series to claim their eleventh Women's College World Series Championship.  The Bruins had earlier claimed an AIAW title in 1978 and NCAA titles in 1982, 1984, 1988, 1989, 1990, 1992, 1995, 1999, 2003, 2004, and 2010.  The 1995 championship was vacated by the NCAA.

Personnel

Roster

Coaches

Schedule

References

UCLA
UCLA Bruins softball seasons
2019 in sports in California
Women's College World Series seasons
NCAA Division I softball tournament seasons
Pac-12 Conference softball champion seasons
UCLA